Isabella Colonna (1513 - 1570) was an Italian noblewoman, a member of the Colonna family.

Biography
She was the only daughter of Vespasiano Colonna, duke of Traetto (modern Minturno) and count of Fondi, and Beatrice Appiani: However, she grew up with Giulia Gonzaga, Vespasiano's second wife.

In 1531 she married Louis Gonzaga (Rodomonte), an imperial captain of Charles V: the two had a son, Vespasiano I Gonzaga, future duke of Sabbioneta. One year later Louis died, and Isabella Colonna moved with his parents at Sabbioneta. Later, after quarrels with the latter, she moved to Rivarolo and the, in 1534, to her fiefs in southern Italy. After she married Filippo Lannoy, prince of Sulmona, her father-in-law Ludovico Gonzaga opposed, and obtained from the emperor a decree which entrusted Vespasiano's education of his aunt Giulia Gonzaga.

Isabella Colonna died at Naples in 1570; her son Vespasiano inherited all her possessions.

Sources

1513 births
1570 deaths
Isabella
16th-century Italian women